3 St Helen's Square is a historic building in the city centre of York, in England.

In 1818, the confectionery business of Bayldon and Berry had a shop at 3 St Helen's Square.  In 1828, the company became Terry's of York, and later in the century, the firm added a restaurant to the building.  In 1922, the building was demolished and reconstructed to a design by Lewis Wade, adding a ballroom on the top floor of the venue.  External events were also catered from the building, including the 1961 wedding of Prince Edward, Duke of Kent to Katharine Worsley.

In 1974, the building was grade II listed.  The shop and restaurant closed in 1981, and the premises became a shop for the National Railway Museum.  It later served as a branch of Swarovski jewellers, then a Carluccio's restaurant.  Since 2020, it has housed the Impossible WonderBar.

The building has two storeys and an attic.  It is constructed of stone, with bronze framing around its shopfront and windows.  Its front is three bays wide, and it has Corinthian columns.  There is a frieze above the first floor, inscribed "TERRY".

References

Buildings and structures completed in 1922
St Helen's Square, 3
St Helen's Square